El Sitio de mi Recreo (Eng.: The Place of my Recreation) is a song written and performed by Spanish singer and songwriter Antonio Vega. It was first released on his album Océano de Sol and produced by Phil Manzanera in 1994.

Miguel Bosé recorded his own version of the song for the project Infancia Olvidada. In order to include it on the special edition of Bosé's Papito album, both performers (Bosé and Vega) re-recorded the song, produced by Rosa Leon and Bosé.

References 

Miguel Bosé songs
Male vocal duets
1994 songs
Spanish songs
Songs written by Antonio Vega (singer)